Mudgeri is a village in Karwar Taluka, Uttara Kannada district, Karnataka, India.  It is close to the historic fort of Sadashivgad located on Kali river. Konkani is spoken as a local language.

Location
Mudgeri is near to the Goa-Karnataka border. It is close to the wayside railway station at Asnoti which falls under the jurisdiction of the Konkan Railway.

Places of Attraction
 Shivnath Temple
 Shri Mahalasha Narayani Devasthan Temple
 Mudgeri Dam
 Mahasati Temple
 Ganapati Temple
 Shri Bramhadev
 Bomnath Mountain
 Venkatraman Temple
 Siddeshwar Temple

References

Villages in Uttara Kannada district